The abbreviation LM or lm may refer to:

Places
 County Leitrim, Ireland (vehicle plate code LM)
 Le Mans, a place in France
 Limburg-Weilburg, Germany (vehicle plate code LM)
 Liptovský Mikuláš, Slovakia (vehicle plate code LM)
 Lourenço Marques, Pearl of the Indian Ocean, Mozambique
 Lower Mainland, a region in British Columbia, Canada

Arts, entertainment, and media
 Little Mix, a British four-piece girl group
 LM (magazine), a defunct British computer game magazine
 Living Marxism magazine, published under the name LM between 1997 and 2000
 Long metre or Long Measure, a hymn-metre with four lines of 8 syllables

Brands and enterprises
 L&M, a brand of cigarettes
 Ledgewood Mall, a shopping mall in New Jersey
 Legg Mason, a U.S. investment management firm; NYSE ticker symbol
 Lockheed Martin, a U.S. defense contractor

In transportation
 ALM Antillean Airlines, a Netherlands Antillean airline; IATA airline designator code
 Livingston Energy Flight, an Italian airline; IATA airline designator code
 Loganair, a Scottish airline; IATA airline designator code
 London Midland, a rail operator based in the West Midlands, England
 Lamborghini Militaria, a series of light trucks, the Rambo Lambos

Business and finance
 IS–LM model in macroeconomics, where LM refers to Liquidity preference-Money supply  
 Lean manufacturing
 Maltese lira, the former currency of Malta

Organizations
 Liberal Movement (Australia), a defunct Australian political party
 Lower Merion High School, a Pennsylvania secondary school

Mathematics, science, and technology

Mathematics and computing
 Linear model, a type of statistical model
 Lagrange multiplier, a method for finding maxima and minima subject to constraints
 LAN Manager, a Microsoft network operating system
 Language model, a mathematical model used in language processing and speech recognition
 Lebesgue measure, in measure theory
 Levenberg–Marquardt algorithm, used to solve non-linear least squares problems
 Leading monomial
 Linear Monolithic, a National Semiconductor prefix for integrated circuits; see List of LM-series integrated circuits
 LM hash, a Microsoft password hash function
 Long mode, a CPU mode of operation where 64-bit programs are executed (lm is also set as a CPU flag)

Science and technology
 Apollo Lunar Module spacecraft
 Leonard-Merritt mass estimator, a formula for estimating the mass of a spherical stellar system
 Light meter
 Light microscope
 Line maintenance, a type of Aircraft maintenance checks
 Listeria monocytogenes
 Lumen (unit), a unit of luminous flux

Sport
 24 Hours of Le Mans race, and related car models 
 Late model, a class of Racing car
 Left midfielder, a defensive position in association football

Other uses
 Legion of Merit, a United States military decoration

See also 
 1M (disambiguation)
 IM (disambiguation)